The colonial forum of Tarraco is an ancient Roman archaeological site located in the modern city of Tarragona in Catalonia, Spain.

Notes

References

Salom i Garreta, C. (2006). El auguraculum de la Colonia Tárraco: Sedes inaugurationis coloniae Tarraco. Archivo Español de Arqueología, 79(0): 69-87. Madrid, Spain: Instituto de Historia. . .

Further reading

Fishwick, Duncan (1999). The "Temple of Augustus" at Tarraco. Latomus T. 58, Fasc. 1 (JANVIER-MARS 1999), pp. 121–138. Brussels, Belgium: Société d'Études Latines de Bruxelles. . 
Noguera Celdrán, José Miguel (2009). Fora Hispanie: Paisaje urbano, arquitectura, programas decorativos y culto imperial en los foros de las ciudades hispanorromanas. Monografías MAM 3. Murcia, Spain: Museo Arqueológico de Murcia. 

Tarragona
Ancient Roman buildings and structures in Catalonia
Ancient Roman forums